The List of ship classes of World War II is an alphabetical list of all ship classes that served in World War II. Only actual classes are included as opposed to unique ships (which are still included if they were the only one of a class to be built, for example,  was the first of the four planned Admiral-class battlecruisers, but the other three were cancelled.)

The list of ships of World War II contains major military vessels of the war, arranged alphabetically and by type. The list includes armed vessels that served during the war and in the immediate aftermath, inclusive of localized ongoing combat operations, garrison surrenders, post-surrender occupation, colony re-occupation, troop and prisoner repatriation, to the end of 1945. For smaller vessels, see also List of World War II ships of less than 1000 tons. Some uncompleted Axis ships are included, out of historic interest. Ships are designated to the country under which they operated for the longest period of the World War II, regardless of where they were built or previous service history.

Ship classes of World War II

Single-ship "classes"

See also
 Submarines of the Imperial Japanese Navy
 List of major World War II warships built by minor powers

References

Bibliography

Class
List Aa
World War II
World War II